Oluwakorede Bello (born 29 February 1996) is a Nigerian singer and songwriter. He signed a record deal with Mavin Records in 2014. Bello is best known for his hit single "Godwin", a semi-gospel and pop song which became a national anthem and topped many music charts across Nigeria.

Early life 
Korede (English:"Bring Fortune") was born in Lagos State, where he completed his primary and secondary school education. He started performing at the age of 7 and went by the stage name African Prince.

Career 
While in primary school, Korede Bello went on to write his first song after forming a music group with a friend. He started music professionally by recording songs in the studio while in secondary school, and eventually released his first single "Forever". Korede released his debut album titled “Belloved” in 2017. In 2016 his hit song "Do Like That" was certified gold in canada. 

He studied Mass Communication at the Nigerian Institute of Journalism and holds a Higher National Diploma certificate. Korede Bello is an Associate Member of the Institute of Information Management.

Mavin Records deal 
After the release of his first single which received relatively positive reviews, he was introduced to Don Jazzy by his manager Casmir Uwaegbute after which they recorded some songs together which got Don Jazzy impressed. On 28 February 2014, he got signed to Mavin Records under which he has recorded popular songs like "African Princess" and "Godwin". He exited the Mavin record label in 2019.

Humanitarian work 
Korede Bello has over time engaged in several humanitarian activities such as the Project Pink Blue Walk for Cancer awareness programme in Abuja, 2015 and 2017.  Korede Bello is a Mental Health Advocate and his aim is to end mental health stigma and support young people living with mental illness.

Discography

Studio albums
Belloved (2017)
Table for Two (2020)

Singles

Awards and nominations

See also 

 List of Nigerian musicians

References

External links 
 

1996 births
Yoruba musicians
Living people
21st-century Nigerian male singers
Musicians from Lagos
Nigerian singer-songwriters
The Headies winners